Bruno Custos (born 29 April 1977) is a French footballer who plays for AFC Compiègne. He also played for Fortuna Düsseldorf until 2009 and for SpVgg Unterhaching, Sportfreunde Siegen and TuRU Düsseldorf previously.

References

External links

1977 births
Living people
French footballers
Sportfreunde Siegen players
SpVgg Unterhaching players
Fortuna Düsseldorf players
TuRU Düsseldorf players
2. Bundesliga players
3. Liga players
Association football midfielders
Association football defenders